Bohle River Aerodrome was an aerodrome located  west of Townsville, Queensland, Australia.

The aerodrome was constructed in 1942, during World War II, for the Royal Australian Air Force (RAAF) as part of a group of airfields to be used as aircraft dispersal fields in the event of Imperial Japanese attack on the Townsville area.

The aerodrome consisted of a bitumen sealed  NE-SW runway. A remote receiving station was constructed nearby.

It was utilised as a 1/4-mile drag strip until its closing on 25 August 2012, to make way for a new housing estate.

Units based at Bohle River Aerodrome
 40th Fighter Squadron of 35th Fighter Group – 20 April 1942
 No. 8 Squadron RAAF – 6 June 1943 – 15 September 1943
 No. 30 Squadron RAAF – 17 August 1942 – 14 September 1942
 No. 76 Squadron RAAF (P-40 Kittyhawk's) – 15 April 1942 until July 1942
 No. 86 Squadron RAAF – 13 May 1944 – 26 May 1944 & 10 January 1945 – 20 December 1945
 No. 100 Squadron RAAF – 22 September 1942 – 22 November 1942
 No. 5 Repair and Salvage Unit RAAF
 No. 11 Mobile Fighter Sector RAAF HQ – 11 December 1943 – 10 February 1944
 No. 22 Repair and Salvage Unit RAAF – 11 December 1943 – 10 February 1944
 No. 44 Operational Base Unit RAAF – February 1943 – April 1943

See also
 List of airports in Queensland

References
OzatWar website
RAAF Museum website
Pacific War Airfields Project website

Former Royal Australian Air Force bases
Defunct airports in Queensland
Airports established in 1942
1942 establishments in Australia
Queensland in World War II